Johannes van Laar (10 July 1860 in The Hague – 9 December 1938 in Montreux) was a Dutch chemist who is best known for the equations regarding chemical activity (Van Laar equation).

Biography

Van Laar lost his parents early, his mother in 1862 and his father 1873. From that point on his uncle N. A. Rost van Tonningen was responsible for him. He finished school in 1876 and joined the Royal Naval Institute at Willemsoord. After several trips on steam ships and reaching the rank of a sub-lieutenant he asked for discharge when he became of age.

Van Laar started his studies of physics, chemistry and mathematics at the University of Amsterdam in 1891. Johannes van der Waals, and Jacobus Henricus van 't Hoff both were professors at that University in that time.

His education deprived him from obtaining a Ph.D. and therefore a career at a Dutch University was nearly impossible. After being a teacher at a middle school he became unsalaried lecturer at the University of Amsterdam 1898 and assistant of Bakhuis Roozeboom in 1902. Van der Waals opposed several of the promotions of van Laar, for example becoming a paid lecturer in 1902 and after the death of Roozeboom the attempt to get lecturer for mathematical chemistry in 1907. Van Laar was appointed lecturer of mathematics in 1907 but was rejected becoming professor in 1910. This rejection lead to a mental breakdown and had to resign his position. He went to Tavel-sur-Clarens in Switzerland until his death in 1938.

In 1930 he became a member of the Royal Netherlands Academy of Arts and Sciences.

See also
Computational thermodynamics

References

External links
 http://www.inghist.nl/Onderzoek/Projecten/BWN/lemmata/bwn2/laar

1860 births
1938 deaths
Dutch physical chemists
Members of the Royal Netherlands Academy of Arts and Sciences
Scientists from The Hague
University of Amsterdam alumni
Academic staff of the University of Amsterdam